Frances Leviston (born 1982) is a British poet.

Biography
Born in Edinburgh, Scotland, Frances Leviston later moved to Sheffield. She studied at St Hilda's College in Oxford University, where she read English. Leviston then began an MA in creative writing at Sheffield Hallam University, winning their Ictus Prize in 2004, which led to the publication of her first pamphlet, Lighter. She won an Eric Gregory Award, for poets under 30 years of age, in 2006. Her first collection, Public Dream, was published by Picador in 2007 and shortlisted for the T. S. Eliot Prize. Her second collection, Disinformation, also from Picador, was published in February 2015. Leviston's short story "Broderie Anglaise" was shortlisted for the BBC National Short Story Award 2015 and broadcast on BBC Radio 4.

Her first novel, The Voice in My Ear, was published in 2020.

Bibliography

Novels 
 The Voice in My Ear, 2020

Poetry 
Collections
 Public Dream, 2007
 

List of poems

References

External links
www.francesleviston.co.uk

Alumni of St Hilda's College, Oxford
British poets
British women poets
1982 births
Living people
Writers from Edinburgh
The New Yorker people